Smoke in the Forest is a 1955 Soviet adventure film directed by Yuri Chulyukin and Yevgeny Karelov.

Plot 
Saboteurs organize a fire in the forest and shoot down a Soviet military aircraft, endangering the life of the pilot. He meets a good-natured guy, lost in the woods. And this boy decides to help the pilot.

Starring 
 Anatoli Berladin
 Ludmila Genika-Chirkova as mother of Volodya (as L. Genika)
 Ira Luzanova as Fenya
 Gennady Sayfulin as Volodya Kurnakov
 Yura Zhuchkov

References

External links 
 

1955 films
1950s Russian-language films
Soviet adventure films
1955 adventure films